The 11th Annual Grammy Awards were held on March 12, 1969. They recognized accomplishments of musicians for the year 1968.

Award winners
Record of the Year
Paul Simon & Roy Halee (producers) & Simon & Garfunkel for "Mrs. Robinson"
Album of the Year
Al De Lory (producer) & Glen Campbell for By the Time I Get to Phoenix
Song of the Year
Bobby Russell (songwriter) for "Little Green Apples" performed by Roger Miller / O.C. Smith
Best New Artist
José Feliciano

Classical
Best Classical Performance - Orchestra
Pierre Boulez (conductor) & the New Philharmonia Orchestra for Boulez Conducts Debussy (La Mer; Prelude A L'Apres-Midi D'Un Faune; Jeux)
Best Vocal Soloist Performance
Carlo Felice Cillario (conductor), Montserrat Caballé & the RCA Italiana Opera Orchestra & Chorus for Rossini: Rarities
Best Opera Recording
Richard Mohr (producer), Erich Leinsdorf (conductor), Ezio Flagello, Sherrill Milnes, Leontyne Price, Judith Raskin, George Shirley, Tatiana Troyanos & the New Philharmonia Orchestra for Mozart: Cosi Fan Tutte
Best Choral Performance (other than opera)
Vittorio Negri (conductor), George Bragg, Gregg Smith, (choir directors), E. Power Biggs, the Edward Tarr Ensemble, the Gregg Smith Singers & the Texas Boys Choir for The Glory of Gabrieli
Best Performance - Instrumental Soloist or Soloists (with or without orchestra)
Vladimir Horowitz for Horowitz on Television (Chopin, Scriabin, Scarlatti, Horowitz)
Best Chamber Music Performance
Vittorio Negri (conductor), E. Power Biggs & the Edward Tarr Ensemble for Glory of Gabrieli Vol. II - Canzonas for Brass, Winds, Strings and Organ

Comedy
Best Comedy Performance
Bill Cosby for To Russell, My Brother, Whom I Slept With

Composing and arranging
Best Instrumental Theme
Mason Williams (composer) for "Classical Gas"
Best Original Score Written for a Motion Picture or a Television Special
Dave Grusin & Paul Simon (composers) for The Graduate performed by Simon & Garfunkel
Best Instrumental Arrangement
Mike Post (arranger) for "Classical Gas" performed by Mason Williams
Best Arrangement Accompanying Vocalist(s)
Jimmy L. Webb (arranger) for "MacArthur Park" performed by Richard Harris

Country
Best Country Vocal Performance, Female
Jeannie C. Riley for "Harper Valley PTA"
Best Country Vocal Performance, Male
Johnny Cash for "Folsom Prison Blues"
Best Country Performance, Duo or Group - Vocal or Instrumental
Flatt & Scruggs for "Foggy Mountain Breakdown"
Best Country Song
Bobby Russell (songwriter) for "Little Green Apples" performed by Roger Miller / O.C. Smith

Folk
Best Folk Performance
Judy Collins for "Both Sides Now"

Gospel
Best Gospel Performance
The Happy Goodman Family for The Happy Gospel of the Happy Goodmans
Best Soul Gospel Performance
Dottie Rambo for "The Soul of Me"
Best Sacred Performance
Jake Hess for "Beautiful Isle of Somewhere"

Jazz
Best Instrumental Jazz Performance - Small Group or Soloist with Small Group
Bill Evans for Bill Evans at the Montreux Jazz Festival performed by the Bill Evans Trio
Best Instrumental Jazz Performance - Large Group or Soloist with Large Group
Duke Ellington for "And His Mother Called Him Bill"

Musical show
Best Score From an Original Cast Show Album
Galt MacDermot, Gerome Ragni, James Rado (composers), Andy Wiswell (producer)  the original cast (Ronnie Dyson, Gerome Ragni, Steve Curry, Lamont Washington, Diane Keaton, Melba Moore & James Rado) for Hair.

Packaging and notes
Best Album Cover
John Berg, Richard Mantell (art directors), Horn Grinner Studios (photographer) for Underground performed by Thelonious Monk
Best Album Notes
Johnny Cash (notes writer) for Johnny Cash at Folsom Prison performed by Johnny Cash

Pop
Best Contemporary-Pop Vocal Performance, Female
Dionne Warwick for "Do You Know the Way to San Jose?"
Best Contemporary-Pop Vocal Performance, Male
Jose Feliciano for "Light My Fire"
Best Contemporary-Pop Performance - Vocal Duo or Group
Simon & Garfunkel for "Mrs. Robinson"
Best Contemporary Pop Performance, Chorus
Alan Copeland (choir director) for "Mission Impossible/Norwegian Wood Medley" performed by the Alan Copeland Singers
Best Pop Instrumental Performance
Mason Williams for "Classical Gas"

Production and engineering
Best Engineered Recording, Non-Classical
Hugh Davies & Joe Polito (engineers) for "Wichita Lineman" performed by Glen Campbell
Best Engineered Recording, Classical
Gordon Parry (engineer), Georg Solti (conductor) & the London Symphony Orchestra for Mahler: Symphony No. 9 in D

R&B
Best R&B Performance, Female
Aretha Franklin for "Chain of Fools"
Best R&B Vocal Performance, Male
Otis Redding for "(Sittin' On) The Dock of the Bay" (posthumously)
Best Rhythm & Blues Performance by a Duo or Group, Vocal or Instrumental
The Temptations for "Cloud Nine"
Best Rhythm & Blues Song
Otis Redding & Steve Cropper (songwriters) for "(Sittin' On) The Dock of the Bay" performed by Otis Redding

Spoken
Best Spoken Word Recording
Rod McKuen for Lonesome Cities

References

 011
1969 in California
1969 in Illinois
1969 in Los Angeles
1969 in Tennessee
1969 music awards
20th century in Chicago
20th century in Nashville, Tennessee
1969 in New York City
1969 in American music
March 1969 events in the United States